Santiago González and Horacio Zeballos were the defending champions but decided not to participate.
Nicholas Monroe and Simon Stadler won the title, defeating Andre Begemann and Jordan Kerr 3–6, 7–5, [10–7] in the final.

Seeds

  James Cerretani /  John Paul Fruttero (first round)
  Andre Begemann /  Jordan Kerr (final)
  Nicholas Monroe /  Simon Stadler (champions)
  Colin Ebelthite /  Nima Roshan (first round)

Draw

Draw

References
 Main Draw

San Luis Potosi Challenger - Doubles
2012 Doubles